Haakon Ericsson (Old Norse: Hákon Eiríksson; ; died c. 1029–1030) was the last Earl of Lade and governor of Norway from 1012 to 1015 and again from 1028 to 1029 as a vassal under Danish King Knut the Great.

Biography
Håkon Eiriksson was from a dynasty of Norwegian rulers in the eastern part of Trondheim, bordering the Trondheimsfjord. He was the son of Eirik Håkonson, ruler of Norway and earl of Northumbria. His mother is commonly believed to have been Gytha, a daughter of Sweyn Forkbeard and Sigrid the Haughty of Denmark and half-sister of King Knut. After the Battle of Svolder, Eirik Håkonson, with his brother Sveinn Hákonarson, became kings of Norway under Sweyn Forkbeard. In 1014 or 1015 Eirik Håkonson left Norway and joined Knut for his campaign in England. The north English earldom of Northumbria was given by Knut to Eirik after he won control of the north. Eirik remained as earl of Northumbria until his death between 1023 and 1033.

As his father's successor in Norway, Håkon Eiriksson ruled as a Danish vassal from 1012 to 1015, with Einar Tambarskjelve as his aide and his uncle, Sveinn Hákonarson, holding some areas as a Swedish vassal. After some years' absence in England fighting the Danes, Olaf Haraldsson returned to Norway in 1015 and declared himself king, obtaining the support of the petty kings of the Uplands. In 1016, Olaf defeated Sveinn Hákonarson at the Battle of Nesjar. After the victory of Olaf Haraldsson, Håkon fled to England where he was well received by King Knut and made Earl of Worcester. After the Battle of the Helgeå, Norwegian nobles rallied behind Knut.

He is recorded as being the ruler of the Sudreyar from 1016 until 1030. In 1028, Håkon Eiriksson returned as Knut's vassal ruler of Norway.

Håkon died in a shipwreck in the Pentland Firth, between the Orkney Islands and the Scottish mainland, in either late 1029 or early 1030.

Notes

References

Further reading
Forte, A. Viking Empires (Cambridge, New York: Cambridge University Press, 2005)
Christiansen, Eric The Norsemen in the Viking Age (Blackwell Publishing. 2002)

1029 deaths
11th-century rulers of the Kingdom of the Isles
11th-century Norwegian monarchs
Deaths due to shipwreck at sea
Regents
People from Worcester, England
Ladejarl dynasty
11th-century rulers in Europe
10th-century rulers in Europe
Year of birth unknown
Norwegian exiles
Year of birth uncertain